Jerome Martin (September 24, 1908 – January 27, 1977) was a Wisconsin politician, legislator, and businessman. From 1971 until his death, Martin served in the Wisconsin State Senate.

Martin was born in Rockland, Wisconsin on September 24, 1908. He attended St. Norbert College for two years. He worked as a businessman, bank director, and oil jobber. In the late 1950s, Martin became active in local politics. He was elected to the Brown County Board of Supervisors from 1958; he served as board chairperson from 1962 to 1970. He was elected as President of the village of Whitelaw, Wisconsin in 1969, serving until 1971. Martin was elected to the Wisconsin State Senate in 1970, where he served until his death on January 27, 1977. Martin died of a heart attack in his sleep in Madison, Wisconsin.

Notes

People from Brown County, Wisconsin
Mayors of places in Wisconsin
County supervisors in Wisconsin
Wisconsin state senators
1908 births
1977 deaths
20th-century American politicians